Liu Tong (c. 1593–1637) was a Chinese politician and writer from Macheng in Huanggang. He was a figure in the Ming Dynasty's Jingling school of Chinese prose literature in contrast to the Gongan school and the well known Yuan Hongdao and his brothers. He is credited with the Dijing Jingwulue.

His Dijing Jingwulue (帝京景物略), or Resume of Sights and Goods of the Imperial Capital is thought to have been a travel guide to the historical and geographical attractions of Beijing. The work mentions the Catholic cathedral and the tomb of the Jesuit Matteo Ricci. Its anecdotes and unusual details make it an invaluable study of Beijing in the early 17th century. In 1630, Liu became a member of the National University and passed his Jinshi examination in 1634. He became a magistrate of Suzhou, but died en route in 1637.

References
Biography by Lienche Tu Fang in Goodrich and Fang, Dictionary of Ming Biography 1368-1644, New York, 1976, vol. 1, pp. 968–970.
Yin, Gonghong, "Liu Tong". Encyclopedia of China, 1st ed.

1590s births
1637 deaths
Chinese travel writers
Ming dynasty politicians
Ming dynasty writers
Political office-holders in Jiangsu
Politicians from Huanggang
Writers from Hubei